Deneys Reitz was a large South African law firm based in Sandton, Johannesburg with offices in Cape Town and Durban. It was one of the "Big Five" law firms in South Africa.

On 1 June 2011 Deneys Reitz Inc joined the Norton Rose Group, simultaneously rebranding as Norton Rose South Africa. At the time of the merger the enlarged Norton Rose Group had 2600 lawyers in 39 offices and was a top 10 global legal practice by number of lawyers.

References

1922 establishments in South Africa
2011 disestablishments in South Africa
Law firms established in 1922
Law firms disestablished in 2011
Defunct law firms of South Africa
Law firms of South Africa
Companies based in Sandton